Puri-Howrah Shatabdi Express is a Shatabdi Express category type of service belonging to East Coast Railway zone that runs between Puri and Howrah in India. It will be restored.

It operated as train number 12278 from Puri to Howrah and as train number 12277 in the reverse direction serving the states of Odisha & West Bengal. It was pulled by WAP P-5 locomotive or Electric Loco Shed, Howrah WAP-7. Rarely by WDG-4 locomotive.

Coaches

The 12278 / 77 Puri Howrah Shatabdi Express presently has 1 AC First Class, 8 AC Chair Car (7 and 1 extra) & 2 End on Generator coaches. It does not carry a Pantry car coach but being a Shatabdi category train, catering is arranged on board the train.

As is customary with most train services in India, Coach Composition may be amended at the discretion of Indian Railways depending on demand.

Service

The 12278 / 12277 Puri Howrah Shatabdi Express covers the distance of 502 kilometres in 07 hours 30 mins in both directions.

The average speed of the train is 67 km/hr.

Schedule 
The schedule of this 12277/12278 Puri - Howrah Shatabdi Express is given below:-

Routeing

The 12278 / 77 Puri Howrah Shatabdi Express runs from Puri via Bhubaneswar, Cuttack, Balasore, Kharagpur to Howrah Junction.

Operation 

As per information on 4 Aug 2022, wef 2 Oct, 2022,12278 - will leave Puri at 5:45 AM IST and reach Howrah Junction same Day  at 13:45 PM 
12277 - leave Howrah Junction at 14:15 PM IST and reach Puri on same Day at 21:50 PM IST

Being a Shatabdi class train, it returns to its originating station Puri at the end of the day.

References

External links

Shatabdi Express trains
Rail transport in West Bengal
Rail transport in Odisha
Trains from Howrah Junction railway station
Rail transport in Howrah
Transport in Puri